Jackson Township is one of nine townships in Starke County, in the U.S. state of Indiana. At the 2010 census, its population was 549 and it contained 222 housing units.

Geography

Adjacent townships
 Davis Township (northeast)
 Center Township (east)
 California Township (southeast)
 Wayne Township (south)
 Railroad Township (southwest)
 Dewey Township, LaPorte County (west)
 Prairie Township, LaPorte County (northwest)

Major highways

School districts
 North Judson-San Pierre School Corporation

Political districts
 Indiana's 2nd congressional district
 State House District 17
 State Senate District 5

References
 United States Census Bureau 2008 TIGER/Line Shapefiles
 IndianaMap

External links
 Indiana Township Association
 United Township Association of Indiana

Townships in Starke County, Indiana
Townships in Indiana